Hot 20 is a greatest hits album by Brazilian new wave band João Penca e Seus Miquinhos Amestrados, and the band's seventh and last release overall. It was released in 2000, 6 years after their first break-up, by now-defunct label BMG.

Track listing

Personnel
João Penca e Seus Miquinhos Amestrados
 Selvagem Big Abreu (Sérgio Ricardo Abreu) — vocals, electric guitar
 Avellar Love (Luís Carlos de Avellar Júnior) — vocals, bass
 Bob Gallo (Marcelo Ferreira Knudsen) — vocals, drums

Guest musicians
 Léo Jaime — guitars in "Rock da Cachorra"
 Eduardo Dussek — lead vocals in "Rock da Cachorra"
 Edgard Scandurra — guitars in "Ricota"
 Paula Toller — female vocals in "Matinê no Rian"

References

2000 greatest hits albums
Bertelsmann Music Group albums
João Penca e Seus Miquinhos Amestrados albums